The Dunnville Jr. Mudcats are a Junior ice hockey team based in Dunnville, Ontario, Canada.  They are playing in the Provincial Junior Hockey League.

Prior to the 2016-17 season the Mudcats competed in the Niagara & District Junior C Hockey League.

History
Before joining the Niagara "C", the Terriers played in the Golden Horseshoe Junior B Hockey League.

The Terriers' logo originally had a silhouette of a Scottish Terrier on it up until the early 1980s.  Since then, despite the name of the team, the logo has shown an image of an English Bulldog.

In the Summer of 2010, the "Terriers" changed their name to the Dunnville Jr. Mudcats.  The Mudcats are the name sake of the former Senior B team from town called the Dunnville Mudcats.

Season-by-season results

Clarence Schmalz Cup appearances
1976: Dunnville Terriers defeated Essex 73's 4-games-to-2
1983: Dunnville Terriers defeated Lindsay Muskies 4-games-to-2

Notable alumni
Ray Emery
Mark Osborne

External links
Jr. Mudcats Homepage

Niagara Junior C Hockey League teams
1974 establishments in Ontario
Ice hockey clubs established in 1974